The 2012 Clash of Continents Exhibition is a men's and women's tennis exhibition tournament, held 24–25 November 2012 in Singapore. The previous event had been a women's only event, called the Singapore Women's Tennis Exhibition. The men's event is in a round robin format, with the women's event pitting the two players against each other.

Players

Men

Women

References

Tennis in Singapore
Clash of Continents Exhibition
Women's Tennis Exhibition